Merhotepre Ini (also known as Ini I or Ini II) was the successor of Merneferre Ay, possibly his son, and the thirty-third king of the Thirteenth Dynasty of Egypt. He is assigned a brief reign of 2 Years, 3 or 4 Months and 9 days in the Turin Canon and lived during the early 17th century BC.

Attestations 
Merhotepre Ini is attested by a scarab seal of unknown provenance (now at the Petrie Museum) and an inscribed jar-lid (now at the LACMA, M.80.203.225). Merhotepre Ini is attested in the Turin canon as the successor of Merneferre Ay.

"Merhotepre"
The prenomen "Merhotepre" is also found on a scarab seal probably from Medinet el-Fayum, on the Karnak king list and on a stele from Abydos (Cairo CG 20044), although these occurrences may instead refer to Merhotepre Sobekhotep.

Chronological position 
The exact chronological position of Merhotepre Ini in the 13th Dynasty is not known for certain owing to uncertainties affecting earlier kings of the dynasty. He is ranked as the thirty-third king of the dynasty by Darrell Baker, as the thirty-fourth king by Kim Ryholt and in position 28a in studies by Jürgen von Beckerath, a result which Baker qualifies as "nebulous".

Family 

In spite of the very brief reign Merhotepre enjoyed, he is attested in the historical records by the Juridical Stela. 
This document, which is dated to Year 1 of the later Theban king Nebiryraw I, contains a genealogical charter which states that Ayameru—the son by Vizier Aya and the King's daughter Reditenes—was appointed Governor of El-Kab in Year 1 of Merhotepre Ini. The reason for this appointment was due to the unexpected death of the childless Governor of El-Kab Aya-junior who was Vizier Aya's eldest son and Ayameru's elder brother. The charter identifies a certain Kebsi as the son of Governor, and later, Vizier Ayameru. The Cairo Juridical Stela records the sale of the office of the governorship of El-Kab to a certain Sobeknakht. This Sobeknakht I was the father of the illustrious governor Sobeknakht II who built one of the most richly decorated tombs at El-Kab during the Second Intermediate Period. Based on the stele, Kim Ryholt proposes that Merhotepre Ini was the son of his predecessor Merneferre Ay with his senior queen Ini and with Reditenes as a sister of Merhotepre Ini. The vizierate was an hereditary position at the time and a change of family in charge of the position would have been an important political move. In particular, Reditenes being possibly a sister of Merhotepre Ini, his appointing Aya (thus his brother-in-law) to the vizierate would bring the position into his own family.

References

17th-century BC Pharaohs
Pharaohs of the Thirteenth Dynasty of Egypt